John Appleton (aka John de Appleton) was a Master of University College, Oxford, England.

Appleton was a mature commoner and Fellow of University College. He became Master of the College circa 1401 and remained in the post until about 1408. At the end of 1403, King Henry IV gave the College the manor of Marks Hall, located near Margaret Roding, one of The Rodings villages in Essex, through the efforts of Appleton's friend Walter Skirlaw, the Bishop of Durham. This supported three new Fellows at the College. The College prospered and developed under Appleton's mastership, especially in the area around Logic Lane (formerly Horseman Lane) off the High Street, to the east of the main part of the College.

Appleton later received a special Fellowship at the College in 1438.

References

Year of birth missing
Year of death missing
Alumni of University College, Oxford
14th-century English writers
15th-century English writers
14th-century scholars
15th-century scholars
Fellows of University College, Oxford
Masters of University College, Oxford